The Syro-Malabar Catholic Eparchy of Mississauga is an eparchy for all Syro-Malabar Catholics in Canada.
It comprises of 72 parishes, which include both churches and missions, with churches or missions in all the provinces of Canada, and one territory. It is currently the second largest diocese in the world by area, after the Syro-Malankara Catholic Eparchy of the United States of America and Canada stretching from the east coast of Canada all the way through the prairies and to the west coast, covering the whole of Canada.

History 

The immigration of Syro-Malabars  to Canada began in the 1960s. As the immigrant population grew, there began a need for pastoral care. The faithful then began to bring Syro-Malabar priests into Canada. The faithful attended Qurbana in various places such as churches or cafeterias/gymnasiums etc. Later, The Apostolic Exarchate for the Syro-Malabar faithful in Canada was formally erected by Pope Francis on August 6, 2015, the Transfiguration of the Lord, through the Apostolic Constitution  “Spiritualem ubertatem” with its see in Mississauga. Until that time, Canadian Syro-Malabar faithful had been pastorally served by the neighbouring, US-based Syro-Malabar Diocese of Saint Thomas the Apostle of Chicago, in whose bishop, since its creation in 2001, was vested the office of Apostolic Visitor in Canada of the Syro-Malabars. Very Reverend Jose Kalluvelil was appointed the first Apostolic Exarch and the titular Bishop of Tabalta. The inauguration of the Exarchate and the Episcopal Ordination of  Very Rev. Jose Kalluvelil took place on September 19, 2015, in the Church of Virgin Mary and St. Athanasius, at the Canadian Coptic Centre, 1245 Eglington Avenue, Mississauga, Ontario. His Beatitude Mar George Cardinal Alencherry, the Major Archbishop of the Syro-Malabar Church, was the Principal Consecrator and Mar Jacob Manathodath, Eparchial Bishop of Palghat (India) and Mar Jacob Angadiath, Eparchial Bishop of Syro-Malabar Diocese of Saint Thomas the Apostle of Chicago (United States) were the Co-consecrators. 
The exarchate was erected into the status of Eparchy by Pope Francis on 22nd December 2018, and the installation ceremony was done on May 25th, 2019 at St. Alphonsa Cathedral. 
 
With the growing immigrant population, the Eparchy is growing as well. The Eparchy has grown significantly since its elevation in 2018.

Cathedral 
The Cathedral for the Syro Malabars in Canada is the St Alphonsa Cathedral of Mississauga. The Cathedral was purchased in the 2010s; the Syro Malabars had previously been using a cafeteria as their gathering place. The first Church purchased was St Thomas Syro Malabar Catholic Church Scarborough, which is currently the second-largest Syro Malabar Church in Canada. All of the parishes and Missions have significant and growing populations.

Notes

References 
 http://en.radiovaticana.va/news/2015/08/06/pope_francis_erects_new_syro-malabar_apostolic_exarchate/1163351
 Article title

External links 
 
 GigaCatholic, with incumbent biographies
 Mar Jose Kalluvelil at Catholic hierarchy

2015 establishments in Canada
Christian organizations established in 2015
Churches in Mississauga
Eastern Catholicism in Canada
Former Eastern Catholic exarchates
Syro-Malabar Catholic dioceses